Colette Justine, better known as Colette Lumiere, is a  French born in  Tunisia-and later naturalized American . The multimedia artist  is well known  since the seventies for her pioneering work in performance art, street art, and photographic tableau vivant. She is also known for her work exploring male and female gender roles, use of guises and personas, and for soft fabric environments, where she often appears as the central element.

Work and themes

Early works
Colette's first performative photography work took place in 1970 when she had herself photographed as "Liberty Leading the People" after Delacroix. She presented this work to the public in 1972. In an installation, composed of white parachute silk, embedded lighting, [lightboxes, lavender-painted floors inscribed with her personal code and audios, she posed as Liberté. This tableau vivant could be viewed from the windows of the gallery. Fred McDarrah photographed it for The Village Voice in January 1973.

By 1973 Colette had completed an opus: with white silk ruched parachute silk and embedded lighting and no visible furniture, she turned her living space into a "Minimal Baroque" sculpture with herself at the center.  The same year, the newly established Stefonatty Gallery NYC offered her a solo show. In that show, sixteen larger-than-life, three-dimensional paintings resembling her, titled "The Sandwomen" were exhibited. Like her living space, the gallery office was transformed into a dreamlike environment. In the office installation/exhibition, The Transformation of the Sleepy Gypsy without the Lion, she posed still every day for the duration as the "Sleeping Gypsy" after Henri Rousseau. In 1974, Colette posed as Persephone in Persephone's Bedroom in a billowing parachute dress for the Norton Museum, in Miami, Florida. That installation environment included her trademark ruched soft fabrics with embedded mirrors. Her street works were exhibited in an adjacent room.

Street art
In the early 1970s she anonymously created large street paintings, followed by discovery by Willoughby Sharp of Avalanche. In 1973, Al Hansen, the late Fluxus artist, interviewed her in a video tape The Ear which records the artist painting a huge ear at an intersection on Spring Street in SoHo, while Arnold Newman was shooting her for Verizon magazine.

The street paintings were executed in early morning hours to avoid identification and possible arrest. One of her better-known street works is The Lips (1974), a painting of a pair of huge lips at an intersection on West 57th Street, that could be seen from the windows of the gallery during her exhibition. The 1974 Norton Museum show presented a long street work It was here which included the federal highway in front of the museum. On the morning of Friday 13 December 1974, during an eclipse, she painted a text by Aristotle on the pavements. Dressed in a pink satin slip, the work ended with a sleeping performance on the steps of the museum which was interrupted by the police. Also in 1974, Art Tape Florence invited her to create two videos of street art performances: There Is No Place Like Home and L'incident a la place st Unnunziata. Furniture designer Dakota Jackson, her lover at the time, assisted her and performed in both street works.

In 2008, her early street and window works were presented the Academy of Arts, Berlin in the React feminism exhibition. In 2011 her work was included in the traveling show React Feminism II which premiered at the Centro Cultural Montehermoso, Vitoria-Gasteiz, Spain; the show closed in July 2013 in Berlin.

Art and fashion: 1970s
In 1975 the artist participated in the Fashion as Fantasy event at Rizzoli's bookstore (co-curated by Frederico Suro). A larger-than-life perforated light box of Colette was featured, while the artist performed in the store and windows in the character of Ragdoll with veiled breasts, a Victorian corset, bloomers and boots. Images of her "look" and her habit of wearing and incorporating undergarments began to appear in art publications, and in fashion and popular press: Art News, Women's Wear Daily, and Daily News. Also in 1975, her work was included in several group shows, at the Idea Warehouse, the Fine Arts Building, and the Clocktower. Her installation, Real Dream, later was the subject of and interview by Jeffrey Deitch for WPS1 Art Radio in 2009.

For the 1976 inaugural exhibition, Rooms at P.S. 1, she transformed the attic with brown satins and tulle, embedded lighting, props dipped in resin and audios. The work was titled David' Wraith and she posed as Marat.

In 1977, Colette represented the U.S. in the Paris Biennale, with Let Them Eat Cake. She also constructed Clearance Sale in the bedroom of Nancy Gillesby Delaage Gallery in Paris. A few weeks later, she performed at the Cologne Art Fair in which she lived for six days in her piece Ancorra Tu. Also in 1977,  Eugenia Cucalon gallery presented a solo show of Colette Street Works ,:It was here". For her opening performance , Colette  slept on the streets in front of the gallery  in  a light blue statin  box titled 'Femme Fatale". in this exhibition  the artist also created a series of light boxes with  photographs   of  the artists she knew or admired.p'( all the art works s were  framed in baby blue frames same color as her  installation  light box and her street art  works .The light box was moved inside the gallery after her performance.  Later that  year, she performed Camille II at the Museum of Modern Art as well as fragments of Camille I, (these works now are part of the permanent Brooklyn Museum collection). Another version of this work was presented in Washington, D.C. at the Polo Gallery. Also on view was a video of the performance in the "Downtown NY" show held in Berlin 1976 at the Akademie der Künste, curated by Renee Block. In her installation :  " In Memory of Ophelia and all those who died of Love and Madness" 1976, Colette  laid in an exotic silk and satin room (with sand color, and blue fabric satins and rags), reclining nude next to another female Tabea Blumenschein the Filmaker's Ulrike Ottinger's muse) .to the sound of echoes of her voice with the sound of Hamlet's soliloquy "To be, or not to be".

Justine of the Colette is Dead Co. (Reverse Pop Series) 1978-82
In 1978 Colette staged a mock death in an installation/performance at the Downtown Whitney titled "The Last Stitch" part of the "Out of the House" exhibition. She performed her resurrection at PS1 now part of MOMA a few days later as "Justine and the Victorian Punks" (the first in a series of living personas). Justine armed with Colette's vision posed as a recording star, fashion designer, inventor & conceptualizer of products - "The Beautiful Dreamer" (Colette) doll, perfume, beautiful dreamer bed, fashions, lips and more. And also was the head of the Colette's estate.

In 1978 Fiorucci invited her to do an exhibition, which included a sleeping installation performance in the windows of the West 59th Street store in NYC. Soon after, Fiorucci began using live models in the store and Colette's "Victorian Punk Look" became part of the 1980s NYC "Downtown New Wave" world. In 1979 Emilio Fiorucci commissioned her to create a line of clothes for the store. Her "Deadly Feminine Line" was showcased in the windows of the boutique and Colette staged a fashion art performance at the Mudd Club in celebration.

During that year, Banco gallery in Brescia, Italy presented "Les actions de Justine"; a mostly blue satin installation with slide projections. She posed as "the Pietà" in it for its opening.  In the second room of the gallery, her record album covers, collages embedded in satin, which recorded her life as "Justine" were exhibited. In 1979 in a store window art exhibition curated by Peter Pakesh held in department stores over the city of Graz, Austria. In her window at K&O, Justine of the Colette is dead Co. posed as a recording star in a white satin environment in her "Victorian Look" promoting her conceptual "beautiful Dreamer LP" (not yet released). Her music played outside on the streets. Concurrently she transformed one of the large mirror rooms of the Neue Gallery for the exhibition "Masculin Feminin" (curated by Klaus Honnef) as Justine's Disco Punk Church Club. This term has currently surfaced in the music industry to describe current music. In an installation at Victoria Falls, a vintage boutique on Spring St. NYC, she presented her multimedia spectacle "Ripping myself Off".  Clothes she designed, inspired by her image, which had filtered into the commercial world, were displayed inside the store.  In its windows she posed as Joan of Arc, in a work entitled "Paranoia is heightened awareness". For its opening a fashion show was staged including the song "Ripping Myself Off" she co-wrote with Albert Crabtree.

During this period nightclubs also became a venue for reaching younger audiences and an ideal setting for her multimedia spectacles - Colette was a regular and performed and exhibited in most of them: Mudd Club, The Underground, Studio 54. Her close association with Rudolf the German nightclub impresario who created Danceteria influenced her to do more nightclub spectacles. Her first installation there, was "F**k Art Let's Dance" for the opening of the club in May 1980. This led to other young artists showcasing their art there. Colette also appeared in the day and the Night life in her "beautiful dreamer" uniforms inspired by the walls of her legendary environment as a living sculpture: an experiment in walking architecture. The fashion photographer Chris Von Hohenberg assisted her in recording her wearing these uniforms for her series of photo works.  In 1981, she joined Niki Carson's La Rocka Modelling agency for unusual models, and staged a multimedia performance in his club Armegedon. By 1984, art in nightclubs was the vogue. The Palladium showcased not only her work but also those of Keith Herring, Jean-Michel Basquiat, Francesco Clemente and Julian Schnabel. 
 
In 1981 she broke record attendance in three consecutive museums shows: her retrospective - "Colette - 10 Years of Work" at the Kunstverein Munster (with a monograph published by Politi); "Other Realities" at the Museum of Contemporary Art in Houston, Texas (other artists that participated with individual openings weeks apart were Robert Wilson, Joan Jonas, Vito Acconci, and Eleanor Antin); and in the show Persona at the New Museum with the Mr. Apology, Lynn Hershmann and Eleanor Antin.

Other public installation/performances putting closure to a period before Colette's departure for Berlin, were Justine's thrift shop on West Broadway (her beautiful dreamer uniforms and gowns were offered for sale to the public with a window work of that theme), and "Art on Stage" a multimedia event held at Danceteria.

Mata Hari and the Stolen Potatoes: Berlin (1984-86)
In 1984 she received the DAAD one year grant from city of Berlin. Prior to her departure she dismantled her "living environment" - a continuously evolving work of art. The late Leo Castelli was involved in placing this inner sculpture in a well known museum.  This fell through, and the environment was dismantled in 1982. The environment was dismantled and placed in storage. Its actual wall fragments (made up of rushed salmon colored satin and white silk parachute material), lightboxes, draped lamps and other furniture as well as her "beautiful dreamer" uniforms have been exhibited over the years: The living installation has never been shown in a public space in its entirety and is currently still in search of a permanent home.

In Berlin she took on a new persona, "Mata Hari" and the Stolen Potatoes. She exhibited her new works and paintings at the Silvia Menzel gallery and Kunstlerhaus Bethanien in Berlin, and the Danny Keller gallery in Munich. In 1985 she created sets and costumes for the Berlin Opera production of Ravel's L'heure espagnole directed by Knutt Summers, and participated with a video room installation in the Venice Biennale for the Italian pavilion.

In 1985 during her stay in Berlin, Three monographs were published on her work: 1."From Silk To Marble" - a series of photographs of Colette transforming herself with a white sheet into sculptures of different periods of history, thus documenting the style and fashion of that period and were exhibited with an opening performance re-enacting the images live.  Künstlerhaus Bethanien (with the Torkil Gudnason) helped her document the images right before her departure to Berlin. 2."Colette new works and paintings" - 85 for her solo show at the Berlin Kunstverein (published by Kammerer & Unverzagt) and 3."Art on Stage", distributed by the Stadtische Galerie Nordon (Germany). Colette presented a multimedia installation / performance with her works on the stage of its auditorium. Its co-publisher was Daniel Newburg Gallery (New York Gallery which represented her work during that period).

Countess Reichenbach - 1986-91
Beginning 1986 Colette moved to Munich, while still maintaining her Pearl St. atelier in New York City. Bavaria became new source of inspiration and a new persona "The Countess Reinchenbach". During this time she created staged photographs from her private performances in the Ludwig Castles, the "Dial C for Scandal" series, "The Secret lives of Count and Countess Reichenbach", the "Light Figures", which aimed to blend fantasy and reality, art and life (she accidentally lived on Reichenbach Strasse.  Her boyfriend's mother was Countess Reichenbach).

During this period, Colette's installations with her art and fashion designs were showcased in the windows of Munich's most prominent department stores: Loden Frey and Ludwig Beck (where her couture wedding dresses were available).  At the beginning of her stay there May 1986 she was awarded a studio at Lothringstrasse, which she immediately turned into an environment. In Munich her works were shown at the Dany Keller Gallery and in Berlin where she often commuted to exhibit her works. There, Nathan Federowsky gallery presented "Colette and the Russians", which included Colettesized Russian icons.  Her haute couture clothes of ruched and crinkled satin and other fabrics were on view at the Boutique DurBruch. A special presentation was held there with models staged inside the store wearing Colette's one of a kind creations.  In NYC, the Gallery of Wearable Art carried her evening one of a kind couture and commissioned her to do a window. During her short return to New York in 1986, before going to Munich she had a solo exhibition at Daniel Newburg gallery "Autobiographs" with an after-opening celebration held with a special installation at Area where the impersonator "Zet "posed in a Colette bed. In a group show, Logosimmi, curated by Alan Jones, Daniel Newburg was introduced to Colette's work and gave her a solo show "Autobiographs" the same year. In 1987, in another solo show "An exhibition for dolls" was presented there.  A group of upcoming artists; Richard Prince, Jeff Koons, Sinclair Cemin, Wolfgang Stahle, Taro Suzuki and Frank Shroeder also were exhibited at Daniel Newburg gallery.

In 1988 works from her "Bavarian Adventure", which included, tall light sculptures, large scale altered photographs, objects and collages were exhibited in a solo exhibition at the Frauen Museum in Bonn with a catalogue published by Dumont Verlag in Cologne.

The House of Olympia: 1990s
In 1990 in an exhibition in Munich at Carol Johns sen Gallery "Visits to the Normal World" Colette began to use the name Olympia. It was the first of seven solo shows at that gallery. In 1991 she presented her Colette sized commissioned portraits in "The Aristocrats"; among the portraits of local aristocrats were Leslie and Dedlef Von Wagenheim, Kiki and Ecbert Von Buehlen & Urbach; and an installation featuring "The Unnunciation". The subject Colette as "the Countess Reichenbach" (with her then boyfriend actor Misha Tregor ("Count Reichenbach") a regular at the Kammerspiele theater in Munich). In 1991

By 1992 Colette returned to New York and made it once again her primary residence, while continuing to travel and exhibit abroad, especially to Munich and Berlin. During that time her art was represented by the Dorsky Gallery where she exhibited new works from the Bavarian adventure and "the figures come to life". In 1990 the Rempire Gallery in SoHo  NYC. presented "Through the Looking glass" a kind of mini retrospective that included a reconstruction of her bedroom. In 1991 , she slept in a glass cabinet as part of her installation."from Liberte to Olympia. ("Rempire Gallery) . "Love in ruins /the artist and her Muse"_  opened on Valentines day 1992 also at Rempire gallery . The works from "The secret lives of Count and Countess Reichenbach" were featured among other works referring to other muses, friends, and well-known personages: a portrait of Frida Kahlo and a large light box "the bath" with a young Jeff Koons- (made from a still image of her video "Justine & the Boys"). The Persona Olympia" emerged in 1990 in Munich when she was beginning the process of returning to New York permanently. In 1991, her work was exhibited with Joseph Beuys, John Armedledder in the group show "The Invisible Body" curated by Alan Jones at the Rempire Gallery in NYC. 

Once she re-established herself in New York (1992), she named her New York Downtown atelier "The House of Olympia". The work of that decade was inspired by the eighteenth century. Like all her personas, Olympia developed a philosophy based on a message as well as a "look".
The rules of the House of Olympia:
 No money - no art
 Retrieving my history. Preservation of earlier works and fabrication of ideas conceived as far back as the seventies. e.g. the Colette Mannequin Sculpture.
 Self appropriation - recycling of images of myself from earlier works into mixed media new works.
 Colettesizing: thus transforming into my style selected masterpieces of the eighteenth century such as Boucher, Fragonard, Watteau and exhibiting them amidst images of myself inspired by that period and in this way synchronizing them.
 Bringing back the return of chivalry and good manners, innocence and romance.
 Art that elevates the spirit and celebrates life.
 Matches the furniture and promotes the return of the commissioned portrait and the art patron.

In 1993, an exhibition at LOK gallery in the Meatpacking District titled "The Ruins and Rise of the House of Olympia" Colette presented her new works. In this installation/exhibition  A Colette mannequin replaced her presence.

Through the nineties Colette continued to seek various settings and stages in which to exhibit. Eighteenth century salon inspired and "Colettesized"artworks were installed in environments created for them:- ex;" Colette goes Uptown "Uptown Downtown gallery" (1995), Eugenia Cucalon (1996) "the House of Olympia persists its way unto reality ", "Me Myself and I", Carol Johnssen, Munich. At the Lowen Palais part of the Starke Foundation in Berlin, she was given her own "Colette Salon". There she periodically appeared and entertained in eighteenth century style, and presented her latest comissined portraits and works of art work of her choice.

In 1997 the "Salon de la Refusee" at the Gerswirn Hotel was viewed both by an art audience as well as random passers-by.  Through its windows a Colette mannequin sculpture was installed in the gallery space, along with Colette's new works and objects, that incorporated her life's costumes.  Simultaneously, In a show titled Art?fashion, another Colette mannequin sculpture dressed in one of her rushed gowns worn in live performances during her"Nightclubbing"days of the early 1980s was featured at the downtown Guggenheim Museum. Nightclubs continued to be a place of celebration after her opening exhibitions as well as a and showcase for her art. ex; The Palladium 1992, Life Club in 1997 after the opening of Le Salon de La Refusee, The Limelight in 1990, and in 1998 a multimedia production with art work, video installations, and a tableau appearance for the opening to songs co-written with Jacob Engel.  1990& 1998-., Club U.S.A "to celebrate chivalry and good manners".

During her House of Olympia period, the Guggenheim Museum in 1992 acquired and later exhibited a large scale box sculpture from the Justine - "Reverse Pop Series " (1978) with LPs and other personal items. In 1993, another of her life-size light boxes from the series "Major works form the estate" (1980) which was exhibited at the Montreal Museum of Art (1980) and the Museum of Contemporary Art in Houston, Texas, was acquired and exhibited at the MOCA. In 1993 another large work from that series was placed in museum of FIU's permanent collection in Miami, Florida. 1993, Newport Harbor Museum, Los Angeles, acquired and exhibited a large wall fragment from her living environment (1982.  In 1995 one of her large constructed photographs from "Real I Dream" (1975) became part of the Ludwig Museumin Cologne collection, and also exhibited in "The Nude Photograph".

In 1999 "Poses", a retrospective of her constructed and stage photo/performance works, (beginning with the early seventies till 99) was held at the KIM Foster Show in Chelsea. A monograph "The Essence of Olympia" dedicated to that persona and its creations was published by "the Institut" (a gallery in Berlin Mitte) where she had a solo exhibition, and the Carol Johnssen gallery in Munich in 1997.

Maison Lumiere-2001/renamed Laboratoire Lumiere 2010
Colette begun using the name "Lumiere" publicly following the September 11 attacks after she was allowed to reenter her Lower Manhattan atelier, which had been covered with white dust from the nearby catastrophe.

Her introduction to her new paintings as "Lumiere" was in NY at Egizio's Projects in January 2002. Later that year, more works by Lumiere were featured in the 3rd Montreal Biennale curated by Claude Gosselin - "The New Me" in 2002. Inside the Mexican Consulate gallery space (loaned to the biennale for the duration of the show), Colette reinstalled her downtown atelier now called "Maison Lumiere". Located in the center of the city and with large ground floor windows, the space was intentionally designed to give the appearance, at first glance, of a high-profile fashion boutique, a home, or a showroom. For its audios the theme song "A la Maison de la lumiere " was co-written with Jacob Engel.

Other shows and highlights of that period concentrated on reaching larger audiences and Colette began using the label "C.I.A. - Colette Institute of Art" and its no 1. Moto - "Fight Terror with Glamor, also " beware of When In Pink ". She presented her C.I.A. (Colette institute of Art) with an installation performance on April 1st at the NYC club" Crowbar". In "Domestic Bliss" (1994), an arresting vision that featured a long pink table with Lumiere plates, could be seen from the streets of Rosenthal's Madison Avenue Rosenthal's Show Room. The Mannequin replacing Colette, was attached to a long table with a train containing at its end a large pile of record albums size artworks from "The Story of my life" series.(78-)

"The Bedroom" in Tokyo - 2004-5 - an entire floor of HPGRP Fashion building in Ginza, a "gesumpkunstwerk" made of light pink rushed satin with her paintings, light sculpture, furniture, clothes, accessories and CDs.

Solo gallery shows in 2006 included: new works from "Maison Lumiere" at Pablos' Birthday gallery, "Lumiere's Dinner at eight" at Carol Johnssen Gallery, and "Intriguing Faces" featuring new "Colettesized portraits" at Vivian Horan Gallery. A portrait of the filmmaker art collector Katerina Otto Bernstein in an eighteenth-century costume, and that of actor Gabriel Byrne dressed as a general, were in the show.

Other installations incorporating fashion and "Fragments of her life" were -" The "ApARTment" exhibition at HPGRP gallery in the Meatpacking District 2007, with installations within the installation :In one of the corners was an installation work titled "Be bold with new beginnings" featured a Colette mannequin sculpture with long white gloves, viewed from the back looking at the window with a series of white suitcases following her. Other sections displayed racks of clothes, furniture, and art made at different times displayed on shelves or stacked against the walls.  The exhibition addressed the nomadic life of the artist, particularly addressing personal concerns at the time and the uncertainties of human existence in general.  "The Closet" - at Windows Gallery, Long Island City, reconstruction of the clothes of her closet resembling a thrift shop with street painting leading to it from PS1.connecting the artist history there to the current show.) These shows proceeded the unnounced vacatefrom her loft, that came soon after and were somewhat prophetic. By 2008 Colette had relocated and was awarded a wonderful studio space at The Marie Walsh Sharpe Art foundation in Dumbo for a year. She transformed her new atelier into a living space and there was able to begin a new body of works.  She travelled to Berlin, to participate "React Feminism" (2008) held at the Akademie der Künste in Berlin. Early street works and store window installations performances were presented, as well as a live re-enaction of a "Beautiful Dreamer" installation with performance and audios.

Her Pearl Street atelier in New York, which was written about by Arturo Schwarz, Peter Selz, Brendan Gill, Jeffrey Deitch and Alan Jones, and published in Vogue, The New York Times, Art Forum, and The National Enquirer (1995) was demolished in November 2007. A 16-minute film The Last Days of Pearl Street documented the destruction with Street Work "Appearances" by Colette.

In 2008-2009 Colette converted her studio at the Marie Walsh Sharpe Art into a home environment, and began a series of new metaphysical portraits; mostly of friends and colleagues :Alessandra Anderson Spivy, Roger Webster, Anthony Hayden Guest, Katerina Otto Bernstein, Donald Bachlor, Kevin Baker etc.. ; and a few celebrities of her generation; David Bowie, Jim Jarmusch, Bill Murray, Susan Sarandon, Blondie and Richard Gere. the studio was open to the public in spring 2009. In February 2010 Colette exhibited these portraits and her "Street Paintings" at Destination Art Space in an installation : "That's All She Wrote" (a 3-minute music video documenting this transition and putting closure to the tragedy of losing her atelier).  For the Windows of Boutique/art space she created a Valentine onsite installation "The Letter" with light blue rushed and torn satin, shredded soft white wig material and a Colette Mannequin sculpture holding "a return to sender" envelope.

Colette/Laboratoire Lumiere participated in many exhibitions in 2011 in NYC and Abroad. some highlights were White sale curated by BethRudin De woody, @ Loretta Howard Gallery, "The Arrival of Mademoiselle Lumiere @ thePavel Zoubok gallery booth at the Armory Show,  Basic Instinct @Black& White projects,NIght Scented Stock curated by Todd Levin at Marian Boesky Gallery.  - 

In 2011, art critic Alan Jones curated a solo show of her works at the Paolo Barozzi Gallery in Venice during the Biennale; and the following year, the film "A Pirate in Venice" a documentary on Colette shot in Venice by Friedericke Taylor, was presented for the first time in NY at the Gershwirn Hotel May 2012 .  More exhibitions in the US and Europe  followed 2013.  

She participated on the panel at the Brooklyn Museum,oct. 13. organized by the Collage center, and the Sackler division of feminist art at the museum. Her  last color show before she relocated to Berlin , was  "Metaphysical Portraits and other Experiments from Laboratoire Lumiere>.2014. at Undercurrent Projects.  

from  2015 - 2020 Colette  Relocated her "Laboratoire Lumiere " to  Berlin, as artist in residence @ the Lowen Palais /Art Foundation Starke. While still commuting to NYC. in 2015 she began to be very active in Berlin while still exhibiting in NYC.  
ex; @,'"Dreamcatcher;" for the Wurfel for Neumeister Barn Am, (May/June 2016), "Vis a Vis :may july."Photo Kunst," gallery, Sleeping on a Carl Andre@ ArtVon Frei summer show. NYC;"Concept Performance, Documentation@ Mitchel Algus Gallery. Feb. 2016. Lisa Cooley Gallery. "Active Ingredient", Jan. 2016. 
She created monuments work for  #40 exhibition  in the attic of PS1 Moma:There's a mermaid in the attic.  another installation/ tableau performance  was created within that installation. . "Homage to Duchamp's Extant Donne; June/Nov. 2016. with  an array of art and ephemera scattered in the attic, in trunks, vitrines etc. 
In 2017. Berlin; "Me Myself and I" @ 68 projects Berlin (with Jurgen Klauke, Nan Golden. Ming Wong etc., A on-site installation for Thanda Projects in Zulu Land "Les Tresors de Lafrique > /Lumiere in Zululand. created while in residency for Star for Life Foundation, Curated by Johan Faulker. In her solo exhibition at Starke Foundation, Lumiere occupies the Lowen Palais II March 2017. Colette Previewed new works in the main gallery. Many Of the new works Featured different versions " of "The Woman with the Golden Mask" tribute to the unknown artist" post ups of the image of Colette in a Gold Venetian Mask were plastered all around Berlin, particularly Charlottenburg in 2015 when Colette first arrived to Berlin, in recognition of the multitude of artists in the transformed crowded, competitive city seeking recognition. During the exhibition a screening room presented for the first time to the Berlin Public "A Pirate in Venice" a most recent documentary on Colette by Friederike Schaefer. 2012. And An room installation /video marathon presented other Documentaries of her work by Michel Auder, Anton Perich, Robert Polidori, Paul Tschinkel, Marc Miller, Charlie Ahearn, Enzo Cupia. etc.  Other rooms dedicated to other living personas of her history, were on viewed throughout the building.

In 2016. Colette was awarded a Guggenheim Fellowship in Multi Media., A limited edition of "Colette Street Works/70's " was published by Antoine Levfebre Editions and presented in an installation at the Hamburger Banhoff Dec 2016, (also At the Book Fair At PS1 MOMA.  Sept 2016 and LA. Book Fair 2017). She has also Been involved in An going collaborative Project Investigating a found cassette of herself being interviewed by Warhol in 1975.  presented as the film "Eric's Tape. 

solo shows in .2017 included  / Lumiere Occupies Lowen Palais II Stiftung Starke Berlin  March/April 2017 - Mitchell Algus gallery Nyc. sept Oct.   
soloshows 2018. Les Tresors de L’Afrique  series I . Stockholm Auction House  berlin diaries." Seven Star Gallery Berlin April /May 2019- Berlin Night Drawings /Susanne Albrecht Gallery . Berlin
solo shows .2019.the Rehearsal / multi media presentation Lowen Palais. / Lumiere s adventure in Zulu Land II.large scale exhibition. new works   Municipal Gallery Bydozgoz Poland. for eye never sleeps festival  
Vivian Horan Fine Arts /New York . september. - "Clean Up Time " Stiftung Starke . Nov. 2019
"All of them witches " at Jeffrey Deitch gallery LA. spring 2020. 

in 2020 Colette returned to NYC as her primary home. Solo shows included " Special Delivery @ Darling Pearls. London.  may 2021.   Nov 20 ,2021 to feb. 12 2022 Company gallery exhibited a large scale exhibition :"Notes on Baroque Living " curated by Kenta Murakami . 
Since then she has been represented by Company gallery in NYC. In  July 2022  Her early street art was presented in "Graffiti " at Public Acess Gallery curated by Ned Neva, with Rammelzee , Daze, & Dash .the exhibition  also introduced a couple of much   younger street artists that continue in  the tradition.

Movies and video documents

Colette the artist has been documented in films and videos on her life and art. the most recent  short film by Phil Cox, "Lumiere & the Lowen Palais "2019. /the  documentary "a Pirate in Venice "by Friedericke Schaefer, "Looking for Lady Gaga" (2012) by Josh Gilbert went viral January 2012.Colette the Artist (Art Tapes by Paul Tschinkell (1993), Charlie Ahearn (1995), Enzo Capio (2000), Michel Auder (1970s to 1980s), Anton Perich (1970s to 1980s), justine and the Boys Robert Polidori (1979), Wolfgang Staehle (1983)  Werner Rauenne (1984). Marc Miller interviews her in Paul Tschinkell's Inner Tube. in 1983. in a video that also included interviews with Robert Longo.

Monographs

 10 Years of Work, Politi Editore and Rempire Gallery - 1981
 From Silk to Marble, Kunstler Haus Bethanien - 1984
 New Paintings and Work, Kammerer & Unverzagt - 1985
 Art on Stage, Nordorn Museum Germany and Daniel Newburg Gallery - 1985
 The Bavarian Adventure, Dumont - 1988
 Colette love in ruins/The artist and her muse, Rempire Gallery - 1992
 The essence of olympia, Institut, Berlin - 1997
 The new me, Maison de la lumiere and Carol Johnssen - 2002
 Kunstler kritisches lexicon der gegenwartskunst,  Weltkunst verlages - 2004

Selected museum collections

 1986 - Ludwig Museum, Cologne
 1993 - MOCA, Los Angeles
 1993 - FIU-MIAMI, Florida
 1992 - Guggenheim Museum, New York
 1992 - Ludwig Museum, Cologne
 1993   Orange County Museum of Art .LA
 1993 - Newport Harbor Museum, Los Angeles
 1997 - Berlinische Gallery. Berlin
 2008 - Kunstmuseum Wolfsburg, Germany

References

External links
Pavel Zoubok Gallery
NYARTS
ArtNet
Collect Colette
Kunstmuseum-Wolfsburg/Interieur Exterieur
Lumiere's dinner at eight
Not a camp classic
 http://www.sopranointhecity.com/blog/2017/4/22/who-is-that-woman-in-the-golden-mask https://bombmagazine.org/articles/colette-lumi%C3%A8re/

1947 births
Living people
American conceptual artists
Women conceptual artists
Postmodern artists
Artists from New York (state)
American people of Tunisian descent
Women performance artists
French contemporary artists
21st-century women artists